Waukell Flat (formerly, Wakell Flat) is a former settlement in Del Norte County, California. It was located on the south bank of the Klamath River  from its mouth, at an elevation of 23 feet (7 m). It still appeared on maps as of 1952.

References

External links

Former settlements in Del Norte County, California
Former populated places in California